Held in San Francisco's Masonic Center for a crowd of 3,000 invited guests, the 2000 Webby Awards were widely considered the peak of the Webby Awards and a watershed of dot-com party culture.  The event took place May 11, 2000, shortly before many of the event's perennial nominees and participants suffered business failures in the dot com crash.

The attendant ceremony and surrounding events were described in the press as "Hollywood-style" and a "bacchanal.".  Others complained that the event was too serious and less fun than in its earlier, freewheeling days, and was too much of a "corporate mixer."  Alan Cumming was the master of ceremonies.  The theme was The Time Machine, from the H. G. Wells novel.  Pre-awards entertainment included guest "fluffers" with feather dusters, fake paparazzi who would excitedly take pictures of arriving guests, and dance troupes from Project Bandaloop scaling and rappelling down the face of the theater building to Capacitor  delivering awards.  Some nominees dressed up as astronauts carrying their corporate banners as flags, and in headdresses and silver metallic wigs.  Google's representatives arrived in costume as they had the year before, rolling onstage in inline skates to accept their award.  Guerrilla marketers from companies that did not get into the event stood on the sidewalk outside to attract attention.

The 27 award winners received a prize of $30,000 each, a first for the event.  As in years past, award speeches were limited to five words.  Presenters included Sandra Bernhard, John Perry Barlow, Mahir, and Tina Brown.  Among the new additions to the judging panel were Robin Williams, David Bowie, and Deepak Chopra.

The afterparty took place in nearby Grace Cathedral and in Huntington Park across the street, which had been covered with tents and served food and alcohol donated by restaurants throughout the city.  Held on top of Nob Hill, one of the town's largest enclaves of old money, the event took a year to plan and several months of permits.  Despite extensive community outreach, and a promise by organizers to pay for restoration of the Fontana delle Tartarughe, a dilapidated fountain in the park as a goodwill gesture, some local residents were vocal in their resentment of the brashness of the Internet industry, and canvassed the neighborhood with protest leaflets.

Future award events were more somber.  By the next year's event, one fifth of the 2000 nominees were out of business, and more than half of the winners had been sold, suffered layoffs, or failed.  By 2002, there was not enough money available to pay for a live event.

Nominees and winners

(from http://www.webbyawards.com/webbys/current.php?season=4)

References
Winners and nominees are generally named according to the organization or website winning the award, although the recipient is, technically, the web design firm or internal department that created the winning site and in the case of corporate websites, the designer's client.  Web links are provided for informational purposes, both in the most recently available archive.org version before the awards ceremony and, where available, the current website.  Many older websites no longer exist, are redirected, or have been substantially redesigned.

External links
Official website
 - a first-person account of attending the 2000 Webby Awards.

2000
2000 awards in the United States
Dot-com bubble
2000s economic history
2000 in San Francisco
May 2000 events in the United States
2000 in Internet culture